Jeannot Robitaille (born 19 April 1953) is a Canadian archer. He competed at the 1992 Summer Olympics and the 1996 Summer Olympics.

References

External links
 

1953 births
Living people
Canadian male archers
Olympic archers of Canada
Archers at the 1992 Summer Olympics
Archers at the 1996 Summer Olympics
Sportspeople from Quebec
Pan American Games medalists in archery
Pan American Games silver medalists for Canada
Pan American Games bronze medalists for Canada
Archers at the 1995 Pan American Games
Medalists at the 1995 Pan American Games
20th-century Canadian people